In molecular biology, the AMMECR1 protein (Alport syndrome, intellectual disability, midface hypoplasia and elliptocytosis chromosomal region gene 1 protein) is a protein encoded by the AMMECR1 gene on human chromosome Xq22.3. 

The contiguous gene deletion syndrome is characterised by Alport syndrome (A), intellectual disability (M), midface hypoplasia (M), and elliptocytosis (E), as well as generalized hypoplasia and cardiac abnormalities. It is caused by a deletion in Xq22.3, comprising several genes including AMME chromosomal region gene 1 (AMMECR1), which encodes a protein with a nuclear location and presently unknown function. The C-terminal region of AMMECR1 (from residue 122 to 333) is well conserved, and homologues appear in species ranging from bacteria and archaea to eukaryotes. The high level of conservation of the AMMECR1 domain points to a basic cellular function, potentially in either the transcription, replication, repair or translation machinery. 

The AMMECR1 domain contains a six-amino-acid motif (LRGCIG) that might be functionally important since it is strikingly conserved throughout evolution. The AMMECR1 domain consists of two distinct subdomains of different sizes. The large subdomain, which contains both the N- and C-terminal regions, consists of five alpha-helices and five beta-strands. These five beta-strands form an antiparallel beta-sheet. The small subdomain consists of four alpha-helices and three beta-strands, and these beta-strands also form an antiparallel beta-sheet. The conserved 'LRGCIG' motif is located at beta(2) and its N-terminal loop, and most of the side chains of these residues point toward the interface of the two subdomains. The two subdomains are connected by only two loops, and the interaction between the two subdomains is not strong. Thus, these subdomains may move dynamically when the substrate enters the cleft. The size of the cleft suggests that the substrate is large, e.g., the substrate may be a nucleic acid or protein. However, the inner side of the cleft is not filled with positively charged residues, and therefore it is unlikely that negatively charged nucleic acids such as DNA or RNA interact at this site.

References

Protein families